Iberia is a city in southeast Miller County, Missouri, United States. The population was 736 at the 2010 census.

History
A post office called Iberia has been in operation since 1838. The community derives its name from the Iberian Peninsula perhaps via New Iberia, Louisiana.

Iberia Academy and Junior College was added to the National Register of Historic Places in 1980.

Geography
Iberia is located in southeastern Miller County in the Ozarks of Central Missouri. The city is at the intersection of routes 17 and 42. Lake of the Ozarks State Park is approximately 12 miles to the west on route 42.

Demographics

2010 census
As of the census of 2010, there were 736 people, 287 households, and 185 families living in the city. The racial makeup of the city was 95.8% White, 0.8% African American, 1.1% Native American, 0.7% from other races, and 1.6% from two or more races. Hispanic or Latino of any race were 3.0% of the population.

There were 287 households, of which 40.4% had children under the age of 18 living with them, 42.2% were married couples living together, 15.3% had a female householder with no husband present, 7.0% had a male householder with no wife present, and 35.5% were non-families. 31.0% of all households were made up of individuals, and 14.3% had someone living alone who was 65 years of age or older. The average household size was 2.56 and the average family size was 3.16.

The median age in the city was 31.4 years. 31.4% of residents were under the age of 18; 8.8% were between the ages of 18 and 24; 24.7% were from 25 to 44; 22.4% were from 45 to 64; and 12.8% were 65 years of age or older. The gender makeup of the city was 48.6% male and 51.4% female.

2000 census
As of the census of 2000, there were 605 people, 268 households, and 161 families living in the city. The population density was 672.8 people per square mile (259.5/km2). There were 327 housing units at an average density of 363.7 per square mile (140.3/km2). The racial makeup of the city was 97.85% White, 0.33% African American, 0.66% Native American, 0.17% Asian, 0.33% from other races, and 0.66% from two or more races. Hispanic or Latino of any race were 1.32% of the population.

There were 268 households, out of which 30.2% had children under the age of 18 living with them, 41.0% were married couples living together, 13.4% had a female householder with no husband present, and 39.9% were non-families. 35.8% of all households were made up of individuals, and 21.3% had someone living alone who was 65 years of age or older. The average household size was 2.26 and the average family size was 2.91.

In the city, the population was spread out, with 25.3% under the age of 18, 9.8% from 18 to 24, 25.5% from 25 to 44, 20.5% from 45 to 64, and 19.0% who were 65 years of age or older. The median age was 36 years. For every 100 females, there were 86.7 males. For every 100 females age 18 and over, there were 79.4 males.

The median income for a household in the city was $30,033, and the median income for a family was $28,750. Males had a median income of $25,500 versus $16,875 for females. The per capita income for the city was $12,918. About 13.6% of families and 17.8% of the population were below the poverty line, including 23.1% of those under age 18 and 18.1% of those age 65 or over.

Education 
The Iberia R-V School District operates an elementary school, a junior high school, and a high school. Junior high and elementary are linked in two buildings, and high school operates primarily in the annex.

Iberia has a public library, a branch of the Heartland Regional Library System.

References

External links
 Historic maps of Iberia in the Sanborn Maps of Missouri Collection at the University of Missouri

Cities in Miller County, Missouri
Cities in Missouri